World Rugby is a sports management video game developed by Brendan O'Brien and David Taylor. It was published by Zeppelin Games in 1993 for the ZX Spectrum and Commodore 64. This was Zeppelin's last release for the 8-bit home computer market.

Critical reaction
Your Sinclair awarded World Rugby 72%, praising good presentation the originality of a rugby management game, but criticising the poor graphics in the match highlights. Sinclair User awarded 80%, highlighting the accuracy and range of the player database but advising non-fans of the management genre to stay away.

References

External links

1993 video games
Amiga games
Atari ST games
ZX Spectrum games
Commodore 64 games
Rugby football video games
Sports management video games
Video games developed in the United Kingdom